James Joseph Butler (August 29, 1862 – May 31, 1917) was a U.S. Representative from Missouri.

Born in St. Louis, Missouri, Butler attended the public schools.
He served an apprenticeship as a blacksmith, and worked at that trade for several years.
He graduated from Saint Louis University in 1881.
He studied law at Washington University in St. Louis.
He was admitted to the bar in 1884 and commenced practice in St. Louis, Missouri.
He served as city attorney of St. Louis from 1886 to 1894.
Presented credentials as a Democratic Member-elect to the Fifty-seventh Congress and served from March 4, 1901, until June 28, 1902, when the seat was declared vacant.
Subsequently presented credentials as a Member-elect to fill the vacancy thus caused and served from November 4, 1902, until February 26, 1903, when he was succeeded by George Chester Robinson Wagoner, who contested his election.

Butler was elected as a Democrat to the Fifty-eighth Congress (March 4, 1903 – March 3, 1905).
He served as delegate to the Democratic National Conventions in 1904 and 1908.
He resumed the practice of law in St. Louis, Missouri, and died there May 31, 1917.
He was interred in Calvary Cemetery.

References

1862 births
1917 deaths
Politicians from St. Louis
Democratic Party members of the United States House of Representatives from Missouri
Washington University School of Law alumni
19th-century American politicians
Members of the United States House of Representatives removed by contest
Saint Louis University alumni